Hebbani is a village on the Nangli - Punganur Road in Kolar district of Karnataka State in India.

External links
Map

Villages in Kolar district